Hakol Mushlam (Everything's Perfect) is a 2002 mini-album by the Israeli rock band HaClique. It was only included in their box-set, Hakufsa, and is a collection of unreleased recordings made in 1998, 2001 and 2002.

Track listing
 "Hakol Mushlam"
 "Shir Hemshech (Haolam Mamshich Lehistovev)"
 "Eretz Israel 2000"
 "Sivuv Hagalgal"
 "Milim Zolot"

References

2002 EPs